Edward Farhi is physicist working on quantum computation as a Principal Scientist at Google. In 2018 he retired from his position as the Cecil and Ida Green Professor of Physics at the Massachusetts Institute of Technology. He was the Director of the Center for Theoretical Physics at MIT from 2004 until 2016.  He made contributions to particle physics, general relativity and astroparticle physics  before turning to his current interest, quantum computation.

Education
Edward (Eddie) Farhi attended the Bronx High School of Science and obtained his B.A. and M.A. in physics at Brandeis University before getting his Ph.D. in 1978 from Harvard University under the supervision of Howard Georgi.  He was then on the staff at the Stanford Linear Accelerator Center and at CERN in Geneva, Switzerland before coming to MIT, where he joined the faculty in 1982. At MIT, he taught undergraduate courses in quantum mechanics and special relativity as well as freshman physics. At the graduate level he taught quantum mechanics, quantum field theory, particle physics and general relativity.  In July 2004, he was appointed the Director of MIT's Center for Theoretical Physics.

Research
Farhi was trained as a theoretical particle physicist but has also worked on astrophysics, general relativity, and the foundations of quantum mechanics. His present interest is the theory of quantum computation.

As a graduate student, Farhi invented the jet variable "Thrust" which is used today at the Large Hadron Collider to describe how particles in high energy accelerator collisions come out in collimated streams. He then worked with Leonard Susskind on grand unified theories with electro-weak dynamical symmetry breaking. At CERN, he and Larry Abbott proposed an (almost viable) model in which quarks, leptons, and massive gauge bosons are composite. At MIT, with Robert Jaffe, he worked out many of the properties of a possibly stable super dense form of matter called ``Strange Matter"  and with Charles Alcock and Angela Olinto he studied the properties of  ``Strange Stars", compact objects made of strange matter.  His interest then shifted to general relativity and he and Alan Guth studied the classical and quantum prospects of creating a new inflationary universe in a laboratory. He and Guth, along with Sean Carroll, showed how building a time machine would require resources beyond what could ever be possible to obtain.

Since the late '90s, Farhi has been studying how to use quantum mechanics to gain algorithmic speedup in solving problems that are difficult for conventional computers. He and Sam Gutmann pioneered the continuous time Hamiltonian based approach to quantum computation  which is an alternative to the conventional gate model. He and Gutmann then proposed the idea of designing algorithms based on quantum walks, which was used to demonstrate the power of quantum computation over classical.  They, along with Jeffrey Goldstone and Michael Sipser, introduced the idea of quantum computation by adiabatic evolution which generated much interest in the quantum computing community. For example, the D-Wave machine is designed to run the quantum adiabatic algorithm. In 2007, Farhi, Goldstone and Gutmann showed, using quantum walks, that a quantum computer can determine who wins a game faster than a classical computer. In 2010, he along with Peter Shor and others at MIT introduced a scheme for Quantum Money  which so far has resisted attack. In 2014 Farhi, Goldstone and Gutmann introduced the Quantum Approximate Optimization Algorithm (QAOA), a novel quantum algorithm for finding approximate solutions to combinatorial search problems. Farhi and Harrow showed that the lowest depth version of the QAOA  exhibits Quantum Supremacy which means that in worst case its output can not be simulated efficiently by a classical device. The QAOA is viewed as one of the best candidates to run on noisy Intermediate-scale quantum (NISQ) devices which are coming online in the near future.

Farhi continues to work on quantum computing but keeps a close eye on particle physics and recent developments in cosmology.

External links
 Recent interview

References

Year of birth missing (living people)
Living people
Massachusetts Institute of Technology School of Science faculty
Harvard University alumni
Theoretical physicists
21st-century American physicists
Brandeis University alumni
Place of birth missing (living people)
The Bronx High School of Science alumni
People associated with CERN
Scientists from New York (state)
MIT Center for Theoretical Physics faculty
Fellows of the American Physical Society